Lianzhou (连州) is a county-level city in Guangdong, China.

Lianzhou may also refer to:
Lianzhou Township (莲洲乡), a township in Yongxin County, Jiangxi, China

Towns in China
Lianzhou, Lianzhou, in Lianzhou City
Lianzhou, Luoding (连州), in Luoding, Guangdong
Lianzhou, Zhuhai (莲洲), in Doumen District, Zhuhai, Guangdong
Lianzhou, Guangxi (廉州), in Hepu County, Guangxi
Lianzhou, Hebei (廉州), in Gaocheng, Hebei

Historical prefectures
Lian Prefecture (Guangdong) (連州), a prefecture between the 6th and 20th centuries in modern Guangdong, China
Lian Prefecture (Guangxi) (廉州), a prefecture between the 7th and 13th centuries in modern Guangxi, China